Magna Kusina is a Filipino restaurant in Portland, Oregon.

Carlo Lamagna opened the restaurant in August 2019. In 2021, Magna Kusina was named Restaurant of the Year by The Oregonian, and Lamagna was included in Food & Wine class of Best New Chefs.

The business plans to operate a stall in the food hall at Block 216, as of 2023.

See also

 Filipino-American cuisine

References

External links
 
 

2019 establishments in Oregon
Asian restaurants in Portland, Oregon
Filipino-American culture
Hosford-Abernethy, Portland, Oregon
Philippine cuisine